Parliamentary elections will be held in Kosovo no later than 2025. If the full four year term of the incumbent Assembly is completed, the election will be held on a Sunday and not earlier than 60 days and no later than 30 days before the end of the mandate.

Background
In the 2021 elections Lëvizja Vetëvendosje (LVV) won 58 seats. They created a coalition with minority parties, including the Serb List, to form a Government.

Electoral system
The 120 members of the Assembly of Kosovo are elected by open list proportional representation, with 20 seats reserved for national minorities. An electoral threshold of 5% is in place for non-minority parties. Seats are allocated using the Webster/Sainte-Laguë method.To form a government, a party or coalition must have a majority of 61 MPs out of 120 seats in the Assembly of Kosovo.

Opinion polls

Graphic representation

National polls

Leadership approval

References

Elections in Kosovo
Kosovo